Hartburn can refer to:

Places
 Hartburn, County Durham, a suburb of Stockton-on-Tees in County Durham, England
 Hartburn, East Riding of Yorkshire, a deserted village in the civil parish of Barmston, East Riding of Yorkshire, England
 Hartburn, Northumberland, a village in Northumberland, England

People
 Johnny Hartburn (1920-2001), English footballer

See also